Baron Omar Rolf von Ehrenfels (born 28 April 1901 in Prague - died 7 February 1980 in Neckargemünd, Heidelberg, Germany) was a prominent Muslim of Austrian origin.

Life outline 

Omar, or as he later chose, Umar Rolf Ehrenfels was born 28 April 1901 in Prague, Austria. He was baptised Rolf Werner Leopold von Ehrenfels. His father was Roman Catholic Baron Christian von Ehrenfels (1859–1932) professor of philosophy at the German part of Prague University. He is known as the founder of the Gestalt theory. His mother was Emma von Ehrenfels (1862–1946) born André, in Bratislava (Pressburg). In her parental home both German and Hungarian was spoken. During World War I she worked for the Red Cross caring for Hungarian wounded soldiers. Widowed of her first marriage she brought her daughter Elfriede (Elfi) Hartmann into their home. The second daughter, known as the author Imma von Bodmershof (1895–1983), was born in Graz. Rolf as the only son of Christian Freiherr von Ehrenfels inherited the title but he had to discard it according to new Austrian laws in 1920. As a convert to Islam he took on the name Omar or Umar, kept Rolf and omitted the others. 1932–37 he was a student of social anthropology (Völkerkunde) at Vienna University and got a doctorate there. At the Nazi occupation of Austria, Anschluss, 13 March 1938, he emigrated to India. There he lived until 1961, since 1949 as lecturer, later professor of social anthropology at the University of Madras. Umar Rolf Ehrenfels died 7 February 1980 in Neckargemuend, Germany having been guest professor at Heidelberg University and co- founder of its South Asia Institute 1961–71. Elfriede von Bodmershof (1894–1982) was his wife 1925–1948. The couple was separated due to the Nazi occupation of 1938. Later Ehrenfels married the French social scientist Mireille Abeille (1924–2007).

An Austrian citizen with strong family ties 
Rolf Ehrenfels was an Austrian citizen all his life. Lichtenau near Krems and Gföhl in Lower Austria was his home parish. Since 1813 the Ehrenfels family were settled in Schloss Lichtenau. Also the castles Brunn im Walde and Rastbach were family properties. Rolf's eldest sister "Elfi" Elfriede Hartmann married a widower with three children and had her own home from the early 1920s. His sister Imma Ehrenfels married Wilhelm "Willy" (von) Bodmershof (Schuster) and they settled at Rastbach castle for life. In 1925 there was a double wedding as Rolf Ehrenfels married Willy's sister Fridl who became Elfriede Ehrenfels. She was born in Trieste, Austria.

A young intellectual in the Berlin of the 1920s 
For a period Rolf lived in Berlin. His first wife Ellen Feld can be seen as she has a part in a film, Das grosse Sehnen, for which Rolf wrote the manuscript. Rolf and his friend Willy Bodmershof worked on it together and shot it partly in a studio in Berlin, partly on location in Istanbul in 1923. On this trip, partly by bicycle, Rolf's interest in Islam was kindled. Also Christian von Ehrenfels appears in it, as a wise man. There are still photos in Ehrenfels archive, Lichtenau. The film is now in the Austrian Film Museum in Vienna. The film was reviewed by Kurt Bauchwitz as press clippings in the Ehrenfels archive show. Kurt was one of the intellectual Jews in the Berlin Wilmersdorf area. With him Rolf Ehrenfels developed a friendship for life. Kurt called himself Roy C Bates when he had escaped to the US after 1933. Their relationship is documented in the Roy C Bates papers in the Grenander Collections at Albany University, USA.

A European Muslim 
Around 1926 Rolf made up his mind to convert to Islam. He took on the name Omar, used in his Muslim circles, Rolf in the family. (Later he turned a Sufist using different invented Sufi names.) In Berlin Omar got attached to the Wilmersdorfer Moschee of Ahmadiyya Anjuman located in Brienner Strasse near Fehrbelliner Platz. Philosophy and religion were common interests to Rolf and his wife from 1925, Elfriede Ehrenfels. She contributed to academic journals of philosophy. She was never a Muslim, but was attracted by the Baháʼí Faith. Christian Ehrenfels major work Kosmogonie (Jena 1916, English translation by M. Focht New York: Comet Press, 1948) fascinated them. Together Omar and Fridl made car tours in Muslim Europe, Bosnia and Albania, in 1929 and 1935. In 1931- 38 Omar wrote several important articles for the Berlin mosque journal started in 1924, Moslemische Revue, after he got a copy of it from the Imam Abdullah Effendi Kurbegovic (1873–1933) at the Great Mosque in Sarajevo. Living at Lichtenau Omar was one of the editorial board. He also wrote for Muslim Journals in English, connected to the Lahori Ahmadiyya e.g. at Woking. At his death in 1980 Umar Rolf was said to be the oldest Muslim by choice, "Wahlmuslim", in Europe. He wrote Muslim (Sufist) articles until the end (Sifat, Zuerich,1978).

On the track of Kurban Said

Young writers at fruitful work 
Like brother and sister Willy and Fridl Bodmershof did, Rolf tried his luck both as freelance journalist and fiction writer. Kurt Bauchwitz and the circles in Berlin (Wilmersdorf?) encouraged him. He got many articles published, mostly under different pseudonyms. His best known one was Othmar Steinmetz. Soon Rolf and Fridl became a writing couple. "My wife and literary co- worker since 1925, has assisted considerably in the planning and laying- out of the book, and Count and Countess Coudenhove- Kalergis in the completion of the manuscript as well as productive criticism". This Rolf Ehrenfels writes in his doctoral dissertation, written 1937 in German, as it was printed in English in 1941. The Preface is dated "Hyderabad, Deccan June 24th 1940". 
From 1927 (?) the two married couples, Imma- Willy Bodmershof and Fridl- Rolf Ehrenfels, lived mostly at Lichtenau and Rastbach, doubly occupied with farming work on the estate and writing. The Ehrenfels parents' home was in Prague, the Bodmershof's in Trieste. Both Willy and Rolf managed to finish doctorates: Rolf Ehrenfels in Vienna in 1937, Wilhelm Bodmershof at Graz University in 1933. Thanks to connections with his father's students in Prague and his mother's friends in cultural, feminist circles in Prague and Vienna Rolf got the opportunity to publish articles and also a serialized novel in Prager Tagblatt in 88 parts called Ein Kriegskind sucht das Glück by Othmar Steinmetz. The date of the complete manuscript in the Lichtenau archive is 13 March 1930. In the archive there are other manuscripts and letters, among others to Tal Verlag, which confirm that Rolf and Elfriede Ehrenfels wrote novels together. They agreed to put one of their names on the text in turns. Evidently with the Kurban Said's novels it was Elfriede's turn . After Rolf had escaped to India February 1939 after eight months in Greece together there was no more Kurban Said.

Copyright debate on Kurban Said 
The copyright sign is, or rather should be, the ultimate proof Elfriede Ehrenfels born Bodmershof has the right to be called the originator of the two novels by the pseudonym Kurban Said. Ali und Nino published in 1937 by Tal Verlag in Vienna is the best known. In Europe the Berne Convention for the Protection of Literary and Artistic Work  of 1886 gives the person whose name is behind the copyright sign the right to be identified as the author of a book. Both publishers and authors had an interest not to have their work stolen. The publisher's right is/was something else, drawn up in a contract. National bibliographies were printed yearly. For years the massive American National Union Catalog NUC, listing books in the Congress library, was printed. Both NUC and the German bibliography Gesamtverzeichnis GV give the information that Kurban Said is Elfriede Ehrenfels. The convention is different in the USA. Americans are not always aware of this. It is a misunderstanding that "authorities" gave away copyright after Austria was occupied by Nazi-Germany. The occupation power printed its sign, the swastika, wherever they wanted. And they wanted it everywhere.
Professor Gerhard Hoepp's (1942–2003) research is a major source to Tom Reiss as he elaborated an article of 1999 into a book 2005. However, in his article of 2001 Who wrote Ali and Nino: to the archaeology of a legend Hoepp sums up competing theories in a review of new editions (Overlook, New York, 1999; Ullstein, Berlin 2000) of Ali and Nino combined with Tom Reiss' article. Hoepp states "dass Elfriede von Ehrenfels- Bodmershof, die auch den Vertrag fuer Ali und Nino unterzeichnete, Kurban Said war, steht inzwischen ausser Zeifel." (That EEB, who also signed the contract for A&N, was Kurban Said, is since then beyond doubt.) The contract for Ali und Nino was made with Mr Tal, who only signed Tal, which appears from the contract shown to Tom Reiss.
His widow Lucy in 1973 tried to take over the copyright owned by Elfriede Ehrenfels. The issue in the 2000s has become, as if a woman could not have achieved a novel on her own: Who was her co-writer? Essad Bey was a guess from the 1930s according to Hoepp. This guess was adopted and developed by Reiss (1999, 2005). The second wave of publication from 1970 introduced the Azerbaijan author Yusif Vazir Chamanzaminli as the sole Kurban Said. "Obwohl diese Annamhe nicht halten lässt" (although this belief does not stand to tests). Hoepp says, it was spread by the Turkish publisher and later in the Soviet Union of the Glasnost. There was no more talk of Elfriede Ehrenfels.

The Chamanzaminli theory was researched by the magazine Azerbaijan International. AI exhibits the covers of about a hundred editions of Ali and Nino and has published an extensive analysis of their research.

On a few, a portrait of Elfriede appears, on one (German 2001), she is shown together with Omar Rolf, from a portrait in the film Das grosse Sehnen. Fridl Ehrenfels' obvious co-writer, if any, was her husband Omar Rolf. His inside knowledge of Islam was significant.

Gerhard Hoepp does not go into this. He is a scientist and has done no research on Ehrenfels, but he has published research on Lev Noussimbaum. Hoepp in 1997 considers Essad Bey as the co-author of Ali and Nino. One of the informants he mentions is Professor Dr. Heinz Barazon. Reiss 2005 shows that he is the legal adviser of Rolf Ehrenfels' widow Mireille Ehrenfels and their daughter Leela Ehrenfels. Some of the data on Ali and Nino from 1970 into the 2000s build on gossip running in Vienna after Anschluss 13 March 1938, as told by Dr Barazon to Tom Reiss, and also distorted memories of aged informants. Mireille Ehrenfels gave the wrong year (1937) and causes for the separation between Rolf and Fridl (conflicts) to the family lawyer Dr Barazon.
Rolf Ehrenfels in Mother- right in India (1941) says they wrote together since 1925. In Kadar of Cochin he states that Fridl was with him during the first eight months of his exile spent in Greece. She did her own research in Greece and her interest continues. They correspond on topics even 1952.

No need for de- Nazification 
Reiss' argumentation builds on his theory that there was a need for "the family´s de- Nazification". This can be compared to documented facts visible also on the dust jacket of Umar Rolf Ehrenfels' "The Light Continent" (1960). "Escaping the Hitler terror when the Nazis occupied Austria, Dr. U.R. Ehrenfels, born at Prague in 1901, took refuge in India in 1939." After respect to his father Christian we are informed of travels to the East and studies. "/In Vienna/ Ehrenfels became founder- president of Der Orientbund, an Afro-Asian students' federation." After a trip to India 1932- 33 "he went back to become the co- editor of Gerechtigkeit (justice) in Vienna, a journal which stood for the integrity of Abyssinia (Ethiopia) and for Human Rights when Italy invaded that country." The book has a printed dedication: "In memoriam the victims of Sharpeville and Lunda" and to his wife Mireille called Mie. 
Tom Reiss did not go deep enough into the documents shown to him when he visited Lichtenau in 1998. "De- Nazification" was a British invention that all prisoners of internment camps had to go through after 1945. Also Jews who had escaped to India to save themselves from Holocaust were exposed to the process. Not all succeeded. Facts about this are not on the Internet. It seems to be a taboo subject to historians. Reiss solves a "mystery" by turning victims of Nazism into Nazists.

A legal copyright owner and defender of authorship 
The Berne Convention copyright law is the reason why Elfriede Ehrenfels in her will could let her right go on to Rolf's and Mireille's daughter Leela Ehrenfels at Fridl's death in 1982.

Alternative point of view regarding actual authorship of "Ali and Nino"
For those wishing to examine the question of the actual authorship of the novel "Ali and Nino", see Azerbaijan International. The staff of Azerbaijan International magazine spent six years of extensive research in 10 languages (Azeri, Russian, English, German, French, Italian, Georgian, Turkish, Persian and Swedish) before publishing their results, which are meticulously documented from research carried out in the National Archives of various countries including Azerbaijan, Georgia, Ukraine and Germany.

There is no doubt that Elfriede Ehrenfels registered the pseudonym Kurban Said in her own name for "Ali and Nino" and "Girl from the Golden Horn." See photos of registration.

Yes, there are first edition copies of Kurban Said's books in Elfriede's metal chest at the Lichtenau Castle but that is not proof of authorship. It would be quite natural for someone who had registered the novels to have copies.

Correspondence exists in the personal archives of the publisher of the book - Lucy Tal - indicating she had never met Elfriede Ehrenfels and was totally surprised to find that the Elfriede Ehrenfels had registered the pseudonym "Kurban Said" in her name. Lucy Tal's husband Peter had died of a heart attack on November 30, 1936, several months before the book was printed.

A passage to India 1932- 33 
In an attempt to overcome the grief at his beloved father's death Umar Rolf made a journey to India in 1932–33. Together with the Imam of the Wilmersdorfer Mosque in Berlin, former professor in Lahore Dr S.M. Abdullah, Baron Omar made a lecture tour from Lahore in the north to Hyderabad in the south as an advocate of the Ahmadiya movement. He sent reports from the tour printed in newspapers. At home again he lectured. The tour affected him so much that Umar Rolf decided to give his life a new turn. He made India his main life project. His interest was deep. His father's colleague the Indologist professor Moriz Winternitz (1863–1937) had taught Rolf as a boy. He had met high-ranking Indians in his home among them the Nobel Prize Laureate Rabindranath Tagore (1861–1941). Mahatma Gandhi's close man Vallabhbhai Patel (1875–1950) was the patron of Der Orientbund in Vienna, which Umar Rolf founded 1932 and presided until his escape to India 1938. What Ehrenfels saw of women's position on the tour 1932-33 made him choose to study social anthropology at Vienna University. In 1937 he got his doctorate with the dissertation "Mutterrecht in Vorderindien". It was translated by himself and published in Hyderbad/Dn in 1941 as "Mother-right in India".

Refugee from Nazist Austria in British India 
In 1938 Umar Rolf Ehrenfels lived in Vienna. He was known as a convert to Islam and founding president of the multiracial students' society in Vienna called Der Orientbund or Islamischer Kulturbund. His doctoral dissertation of 1937 built on a strongly anti- Aryan theory. As an active anti- fascist Umar Rolf had to flee to save his life after the Nazi occupation of Austria 13 March 1938. His wife Elfriede did not want to leave Austria. Rolf tried to protect her from harassment by a divorce in 1938, which was denied. Franz Kafka's friend and biographer Max Brod (1884–1968) was editor of Prager Tageblatt that had published many texts by Rolf. Brod managed to warn Rolf, who was lecturing in Prague, not to go back to Vienna, where he was on the Nazi death list. In 1939 Brod fled to Tel Aviv. He stayed in contact with Umar Rolf for life. They were engaged in JCM, an organisation to near the three religions. This was a recurrent theme of the Moslemische revue from 1924 on.
Ehrenfels left his home by way of Greece trying to find solutions. His wife went with him and friends came to support him. Thanks to Sir Akbar Hydari (1869–1941) Baron von Ehrenfels in 1939 could escape to be the guest of The Nizam of Hyderabad Deccan in South India. Motherright in India has a printed dedication saying: "To Sir Akbar Hydari, the Chancellor of the Osmania University, the distinguished promoter of science and learning in India." According to plans Ehrenfels was to become professor of a new department of anthropology but a Nazi party member from Vienna came in his way. One trace of this plan is Ilm-ul Aqam. It is anthropological textbook for students in two volumes translated from Ehrenfels' manuscript in English into Urdu by Dr. Syed Abid Hussain. A letter to Max Brod 1941 says: "General and Indian Ethnology for the layman". 
The situation in India changed at the outbreak of World War II September 1939. Austrian passports were considered "German" from March 1938. The war meant that antifascist refugee Umar Rolf Ehrenfels was now an "enemy alien". Ehrenfels was deprived of his liberty until 1946 in two British India internment camps most of the time at Yercaud, a hill station. He managed to do some anthropological fieldwork - under police escort. He learnt languages and created art as he was a painter, having his first exhibitions in Prague and Vienna.

Respected in India .. and East Africa 
In 1949 Ehrenfels lectured before the Indian Prime Minister Jawaharlal Nehru (1889–1964) and got an honorary Indian citizenship. He was awarded the Sarat Chandra Roy Golden Medal for original contributions to Anthropology by the Royal Asiatic Society of Bengal. Ehrenfels had suffered hardships as a British Empire political prisoner like other freedom fighters. A forced exile had brought him back as the Nizam's guest but he became an active builder of the new republic. He used anthropology with a historical and interdisciplinary outlook to strengthen the self-esteem of Indians particularly women. He wrote many anthropological articles and gave radio talks. He took part in social work. Always infused with his passion for women's rights, not only in theory but in implementation in real life. 
In 1949–1961 Ehrenfels was head and professor of the Department of Anthropology, founded in 1945, at Madras University. He held several grants from the Viking Fund, New York and did field work reinforcing the theories he had presentad in his dissertation 1937. In 1957–58 he held a Swedish grant to make his longed for field work in East Africa, described in the bok The Light Continent (1960), translated into German and Telugu: Kaanti Seema.

Back in Europe 
From Madras Ehrenfels and his newly wed wife Mireielle Ehrenfels moved to Heidelberg in 1961. Together they went to do a last fieldwork in India in the mid 60s. Apart from a book in 1969 there is a great amount of unpublished material in the Lichtenau archive. After her husband's death Mireille Ehrenfels made Lichtenau her home. She made great efforts in restoring the Lichtenau and Rastbach castles after the damages during the war as well as organising the Ehrenfels Archive.

Dress codes 
A recurrent theme in Ehrenfels' writings from the early 1920s was dress codes and women's rights.
Ehrenfels insisted that both men and women should stick to the pre- colonial traditions of the tropics which was to leave the upper part of the body uncovered. Ehrenfels lived as he taught and adjusted his dress to the climate but he could only do so in private. In British India there was legislation punishing non- indigenous men for "disgracing European dignity" by wearing the dhoti.
In 1973 the International Anthropological and Ethnological Congress IUAES was held in Chicago presided by Professor  Sol Tax  (1907–1995). Sol Tax Dr. Ehrenfels' paper Clothing and Power Abuse was printed in two of the congress volumes. 1975 in War: Its Causes and Correlates. Part 2: Psychological and psychiatric considerations of the etiology of war p. 157-61. 1979 in  The Fabrics of Culture: The Anthropology of Clothing and Adornment  p. 399-404. Professor Sol Tax presented the 1973 congress in Chicago as the first of the decolonization era and demanded peace research to be a worldwide commitment ever after. The next IUAES congress in 1978 was for the first time held in the third world, in New Delhi, India, presided by  Lalita Prasad Vidyarthi  (1931–1985) L. P. Vidyarthi

Texts available in context thanks to digitisation 
He appears both in the aspect as a Muslim and Islamologist and as a Vienna University trained professional social scientist working at Madras University (1949–61) and Heidelberg University (1961 – c. 1975) doing scientific, published fieldwork in South Asia 1932–1964. The World Catalog http://worldcat.org database, although only primary, leads to several titles.
Most of Ehrenfels' articles written for the Moslemische Revue in Berlin can now be read http://berlin.ahmadiyya.org/m-rev/index.htm This is the only genuine journal published in by the Berlin Mosque. The name was taken by others later.
Umar Rolf Ehrenfels is included in the book  Islam Our Choice  first edition May 1961 is online. http://aaiil.org/text/books/kk/islamourchoicemuslimconvertstories/islamourchoicemuslimconvertstories.pdf Dr. Ehrenfels expressed his Muslim faith as it had crystallized over the years in the article The How and Why of Conversion to Islam published in June, 1961 in the Islamic Review, Woking. http://www.wokingmuslim.org/work/islamic_review/index.htm A fact box contains his life story. In 1967 the article was translated into German published in the Al Muslim, Frankfurt/M. 
By that time Dr. Ehrenfels' work at the Heidelberg University South Asia Institute as a guest professor employed as a senior research fellow Ehrenfels had made him move even further. From his conversion on he saw Islam as a world-encompassing unifying link of mankind. Over the years he deepened his understanding and experiencing other religious forms into sharing the mystical oneness.

After his escape from the Nazi terror in Austria after March 1938, Ehrenfels was received as the Guest of the Nizam's Government thanks to Sir Akbar Haydari. In 1939 Ehrenfels wrote "Indian and general anthropology for the layman", a two volume textbook for the students of anthropology he was planned to have at the Osmania University in Hyderabad. It was translated into Urdu, the educational language of the university, as  Ilmul Aqvam  280 + 197 printed pages. It was published in Delhi by a'njuman e taraq y e a'rdv dhly in December 1941. Digitisation was made October 22, 2010. The Urdu translator's name say ad 'a'bid h'usain was by mistake given as the author's name.
The Hyderabad textbook  Ilmul Aqvam  written by Dr. Ehrenfels can now be read online by Urdu readers all over the world. For some reason the University of Wisconsin Library at Madison has a copy of  Ilmul Aqvam . The author's name is there given as Daktar Bairan Umar Ralf Ehranfels and the translator as Daktar Sayyid Husain Sahib.

Works and publications

Published material
 Omar or Umar Rolf Ehrenfels, 1923–1978. The bibliography of printed works contains over 300 numbers, made up by Siv Hackzell 1994–2012, not yet published. Books:
 1941. Motherright in India. Introduction by W. Koppers. 229 p. Ill. Revised transl. of Ph.D. diss. Hyderabad-Deccan: Oxford Univ. Press in Osmania Univ. series. Reviews in Internet.
 1942. Ilmul Aqvam. Vol. 1–2. An anthropological textbook for students translated from URE's manuscript in English into Urdu by Dr. Syed Abid Hussain. Delhi: Anjuman Taraqqi-Urudu. Digitised in 2010. External link.http://oudl.osmania.ac.in 
 1952. Kadar of Cochin. Tribal monograph. Preface P.W. Schmidt. Ill. University of Madras Anthropological Series No 1. Reviews n Internet.
 1960. The Light Continent. Bombay, London, New York: Asia Publishing House. Reviews in Internet. Translations:
 1962. Im lichten Kontinent: Erfahrungen eines Ethnologen in Ostafrika. Translated by Dr. H. Venedey. Register by URE & M.S. Gopalakrishnan. Darmstadt: Progress Verlag.
 1963. Kaanti Seema. Translated into Telugu by Smt. Ramalakshimi Arudra. Madras/ Machilipatnam/ Secunderabad: M. Seshachalam & Co.
 1969. Innere Entwicklungshilfe: eine ethnologische Studie in Südindien. Schriftenreihe des Südasien-Instituts der Univ. Heidelberg.
 Leela Ehrenfels, 2004. Reader's Forum: Ali & Nino Copyright in Azerbaijan International, Vol. 12:4 (Winter 2004), pp 10 ff.
Eric Germain & Nathalie Clayer eds, 2008. Islam in Inter-War Europe. New York: Columbia University Press. See google books
Eric Germain, 2008. "The First Muslim Missions on a European Scale: Ahmadi-Lahori Networks in the Inter-War Period" pp. 89–127 in Germain- Clayer eds. Chapter also printed in The Light- Islamic Review, Lahore 2009/ 1–2.
 Siv Hackzell, 2011. Umar Rolf Ehrenfels: Mother-right Anthropologist of The "Vienna School" in the Cultural Triangle Europe- India- East Africa. BA- thesis at Stockholm University, Department of Social Anthropology. Copy also in the Royal/ National Library.
 Gerhard Hoepp.
 1997. Mohammad Essad Bey: nur Orient fuer Europaeer? in Asien Afrika Lateinamerika, Berlin, Vol. 25:1, pp. 75–97.
 2002. Wer schrieb Ali und Nino?. Zur Archaeologie einer Legende in Zenith: Zeitschrift für den Orient, Hamburg, no 2 pp. 59–61.
 Karl Jettmar, 1980. Umar Rolf von Ehrenfels (1901–1980) in Mitteilungen der Anthropologischen Gesellschaft in Wien CX Band S. 199- 201.
 Tom Reiss.
 1999. The Man from the East in The New Yorker p.68-83.
 2005. The Orientalist. Solving the Mystery of a Strange and Dangerous Life New York: Random House.
 Ferdinand Weinhandl, ed. 1960. Gestalthaftes Sehen. Ergebnisse und Aufgaben der Morphologie. Zum 100-jährigen Geburtstag von Christian v. Ehrenfels. Darmstadt: Wissenschaftliche Buchgesellschaft.
Lalita Prasad Vidyarthi, 1978. Rise of anthropology in India: a social science orientation. Volym 1. Delhi: Naurang Rai. NB Writes Ehrenfel/Ehrenfel's. See Google books.
 Azerbaijan International, Vol. 15:2-4 (2011). Edited by Betty Blair. "Who Wrote Azerbaijan's Most Famous Novel: Ali and Nino. The Business of Literature". Two separate volumes, in English and in Azeri, 364 pages, approximately 1200 photos.

Unpublished documents 
Documents in the Ehrenfels archive at Lichtenau that Siv Hackzell organised and worked with 1994, 1995 and 1998 for a biography of UR Ehrenfels. Mireille Ehrenfels in 1998 gave Tom Reiss access to this material. He used it for his article in the New Yorker 1999 extended into his book 2005.
Copies of some of the documents in the Ehrenfels archive can be found in the Roy C Bates papers at the Grenander Collections, Albany. Ehrenfels and Kurt Bauchwitz stayed in contact by writing letters, from 1939 on, preserved in the archive. It also has copies of Ehrenfels' prints.
The Women's History Collections in Gothenburg, Sweden has letters and copies of prints.

References

1901 births
1980 deaths
Writers from Graz
Anthropology educators
Anthropology writers
Austrian anthropologists
Austrian orientalists
Austrian non-fiction writers
Barons of Austria
Converts to Islam
German Ahmadis
20th-century anthropologists
20th-century non-fiction writers